Tom Kennedy (born 20 October 1957)  is an Australian Paralympic wheelchair rugby player.  He won a silver medal at the 2000 Sydney Games in the mixed wheelchair rugby event.  He was born in Wauchope, New South Wales.

References

External links
 

1957 births
Living people
Paralympic wheelchair rugby players of Australia
Paralympic silver medalists for Australia
Paralympic medalists in wheelchair rugby
Wheelchair rugby players at the 2000 Summer Paralympics
Medalists at the 2000 Summer Paralympics
Sportsmen from New South Wales
People from the Mid North Coast